Syed Zakaria Zuffri (born 12 October 1975) is a former Indian first-class cricketer who played for Assam and Railways in the Ranji Trophy. He was a left-handed wicket-keeper batsman. He was CEO of Bangladesh Premier League.

Zuffri became the head coach of Assam cricket team ahead of the 2018/19 Ranji season.

References

External links
 

1975 births
Living people
Indian cricketers
Cricketers from Guwahati
Assam cricketers
East Zone cricketers
Railways cricketers
Indian cricket coaches
Wicket-keepers